Saline Joniche is a town in Calabria, southern Italy, administratively a frazione of Montebello Ionico.

Frazioni of the Province of Reggio Calabria